Asha Seth, (born December 15, 1939) is a Canadian politician and doctor. She was appointed to the Senate of Canada (for Ontario) by Stephen Harper on January 6, 2012, and sat as a Conservative until reaching the mandatory retirement age of 75 on December 15, 2014.

She was born in India and trained in medicine at the King George Medical College in Lucknow and the Royal Berkshire Hospital in the UK.  She became a Canadian citizen in 1974. She worked as an obstetrician and gynecologist at St. Joseph's Health Centre in Toronto since 1976, and is also known as a philanthropist, having founded the NIMDAC Foundation.  She is a National Board member of the Canadian National Institute for the Blind.  She is part of the executive team of the Canada India Foundation.

In 2010, Seth was one of the recipients of the Top 25 Canadian Immigrant Awards, presented by Canadian Immigrant Magazine.

References

External links
 Senate biography
 

Canadian senators from Ontario
Conservative Party of Canada senators
King George's Medical University alumni
1939 births
Politicians from Toronto
Canadian obstetricians
Living people
Women members of the Senate of Canada
21st-century Canadian women politicians
Canadian politicians of Indian descent